The CCHA All-Tournament Team was an honor bestowed at the conclusion of the NCAA Division I Central Collegiate Hockey Association conference tournament to the players judged to have performed the best during the championship. The team was composed of three forwards, two defensemen and one goaltender with additional players named in the event of a tie. Voting for the honor was conducted by the head coaches of each member team once the tournament has completed and any player regardless of their team's finish is eligible.

The All-Tournament Team began being awarded after the first championship in 1972 and continued for four seasons before being discontinued after 1975. In 1983, a year after 4 teams broke away from the WCHA and joined the CCHA, the all-tournament team returned and remained until the dissolution of the conference in 2013.

All-Tournament Teams

1970s

1980s

1990s

2000s

2010s

All-Tournament Team players by school

Current CCHA Teams

Former CCHA Teams

Multiple appearances

See also
CCHA Awards
Most Valuable Player in Tournament

References

External links

College ice hockey trophies and awards in the United States